Sedimentary basins are region-scale depressions of the Earth's crust where subsidence has occurred and a thick sequence of sediments have accumulated to form a large three-dimensional body of sedimentary rock. They form when long-term subsidence creates a regional depression that provides accommodation space for accumulation of sediments. Over millions or tens or hundreds of millions of years the deposition of sediment, primarily gravity-driven transportation of water-borne eroded material, acts to fill the depression. As the sediments are buried, they are subject to increasing pressure and begin the processes of compaction and lithification that transform them into sedimentary rock.

Sedimentary basins are created by deformation of Earth's lithosphere in diverse geological settings, usually as a result of plate tectonic activity. Mechanisms of crustal deformation that lead to subsidence and sedimentary basin formation include the thinning of underlying crust; depression of the crust by sedimentary, tectonic or volcanic loading; or changes in the thickness or density of underlying or adjacent lithosphere. Once the process of basin formation has begun, the weight of the sediments being deposited in the basin adds a further load on the underlying crust that accentuates subsidence and thus amplifies basin development as a result of isostasy.

The long-term preserved geologic record of a sedimentary basin is a large scale contiguous three-dimensional package of sedimentary rocks created during a particular period of geologic time, a 'stratigraphic succession', that geologists continue to refer to as a sedimentary basin even if it is no longer a bathymetric or topographic depression. The Williston Basin, Molasse basin and Magallanes Basin are examples of sedimentary basins that are no longer depressions. Basins formed in different tectonic regimes vary in their preservation potential. Intracratonic basins, which form on highly-stable continental interiors, have a high probability of preservation. In contrast, sedimentary basins formed on oceanic crust are likely to be destroyed by subduction. Continental margins formed when new ocean basins like the Atlantic are created as continents rift apart are likely to have lifespans of hundreds of millions of years, but may be only partially preserved when those ocean basins close as continents collide.

Sedimentary basins are of great economic importance. Almost all the world's natural gas and petroleum and all of its coal are found in sedimentary rock. Many metal ores are found in sedimentary rocks formed in particular sedimentary environments. Sedimentary basins are also important from a purely scientific perspective because their sedimentary fill provides a record of Earth's history during the time in which the basin was actively receiving sediment.

More than six hundred sedimentary basins have been identified worldwide. They range in areal size from tens of square kilometers to well over a million, and their sedimentary fills range from one to almost twenty kilometers in thickness.

Basin classification  
A dozen or so common types of sedimentary basins are widely recognized and several classification schemes are proposed, however no single classification scheme is recognized as the standard.

Most sedimentary basin classification schemes are based on one or more of these interrelated criteria: 
 Plate tectonic setting - the proximity to a divergent, convergent or transform plate tectonic boundary and the type and origin of the tectonically-induced forces that cause a basin to form, specifically those active at the time of active sedimentation in the basin.
 Nature of underlying crust - basins formed on continental crust are quite different from those formed on oceanic crust as the two types of lithosphere have very different mechanical characteristics (rheology) and different densities, which means they respond differently to isostasy. 
 Geodynamics of basin formation - the mechanical and thermal forces that cause lithosphere to subside to form a basin.
 Petroleum/economic potential - basin characteristics that influence the likelihood for the basin to have an accumulations of petroleum or the manner in which it formed.

Widely-recognized types of sedimentary basins 
Although no one basin classification scheme has been widely adopted, several common types of sedimentary basins are widely accepted and well understood as distinct types. Over its complete lifespan a single sedimentary basin can go through multiple phases and evolve from one of these types to another, such as a rift process going to completion to form a passive margin. In this case the sedimentary rocks of the rift basin phase are overlain by those rocks deposited during the passive margin phase. Hybrid basins where a single regional basin results from the processes that are characteristic of multiple of these types are also possible.

Mechanics of formation 
Sedimentary basins form as a result of regional subsidence of the lithosphere, mostly as a result of a few geodynamic processes.

Lithospheric stretching 

If the lithosphere is caused to stretch horizontally, by mechanisms such as rifting (which is associated with divergent plate boundaries) or ridge-push or trench-pull (associated with convergent boundaries), the effect is believed to be twofold. The lower, hotter part of the lithosphere will "flow" slowly away from the main area being stretched, whilst the upper, cooler and more brittle crust will tend to fault (crack) and fracture. The combined effect of these two mechanisms is for Earth's surface in the area of extension to subside, creating a geographical depression which is then often infilled with water and/or sediments. (An analogy is a piece of rubber, which thins in the middle when stretched.)

An example of a basin caused by lithospheric stretching is the North Sea – also an important location for significant hydrocarbon reserves. Another such feature is the Basin and Range Province which covers most of Nevada, forming a series of horst and graben structures.

Tectonic extension at divergent boundaries where continental rifting is occurring can create a nascent ocean basin leading to either an ocean or the failure of the rift zone. Another expression of lithospheric stretching results in the formation of ocean basins with central ridges. The Red Sea is in fact an incipient ocean, in a plate tectonic context. The mouth of the Red Sea is also a tectonic triple junction where the Indian Ocean Ridge, Red Sea Rift and East African Rift meet. This is the only place on the planet where such a triple junction in oceanic crust is exposed subaerially. This is due to a high thermal buoyancy (thermal subsidence) of the junction, and also to a local crumpled zone of seafloor crust acting as a dam against the Red Sea.

Lithospheric flexure  

Lithospheric flexure is another geodynamic mechanism that can cause regional subsidence resulting in the creation of a sedimentary basin. If a load is placed on the lithosphere, it will tend to flex in the manner of an elastic plate. The magnitude of the lithospheric flexure is a function of the imposed load and the flexural rigidity of the lithosphere, and the wavelength of flexure is a function of flexural rigidity of the lithospheric plate. Flexural rigidity is in itself, a function of the lithospheric mineral composition, thermal regime, and effective elastic thickness of the lithosphere.

Plate tectonic processes that can create sufficient loads on the lithosphere to induce basin-forming processes include:
 formation of new mountain belts through orogeny create massive regional topographic highs that impose loads on the lithosphere and can result in foreland basins.
 growth of a volcanic arc as the result of subduction or even the formation of a hotspot volcanic chain.
 growth of an accretionary wedge and thrusting of it onto the overriding tectonic plate can contribute to the formation of forearc basins.

After any kind of sedimentary basin has begun to form, the load created by the water and sediments filling the basin creates additional load, thus causing additional lithospheric flexure and amplifying the original subsidence that created the basin, regardless of the original cause of basin inception.

Thermal subsidence 
Cooling of a lithospheric plate, particularly young oceanic crust or recently stretched continental crust, causes thermal subsidence. As the plate cools it shrinks and becomes denser through thermal contraction. Analogous to a solid floating in a liquid, as the lithospheric plate gets denser it sinks because it displaces more of the underlying mantle through an equilibrium process known as isostasy.

Thermal subsidence is particularly measurable and observable with oceanic crust, as there is a well-established correlation between the age of the underlying crust and depth of the ocean. As newly-formed oceanic crust cools over a period of tens of millions of years. This is an important contribution to subsidence in rift basins, backarc basins and passive margins where they are underlain by newly-formed oceanic crust.

Strike-slip deformation 

In strike-slip tectonic settings, deformation of the lithosphere occurs primarily in the plane of Earth as a result of near horizontal maximum and minimum principal stresses. Faults associated with these plate boundaries are primarily vertical. Wherever these vertical fault planes encounter bends, movement along the fault can create local areas of compression or tension.

When the curve in the fault plane moves apart, a region of transtension occurs and sometimes is large enough and long-lived enough to create a sedimentary basin often called a pull-apart basin or strike-slip basin. These basins are often roughly rhombohedral in shape and may be called a rhombochasm. A classic rhombochasm is illustrated by the Dead Sea rift, where northward movement of the Arabian Plate relative to the Anatolian Plate has created a strike slip basin.

The opposite effect is that of transpression, where converging movement of a curved fault plane causes collision of the opposing sides of the fault. An example is the San Bernardino Mountains north of Los Angeles, which result from convergence along a curve in the San Andreas fault system. The Northridge earthquake was caused by vertical movement along local thrust and reverse faults "bunching up" against the bend in the otherwise strike-slip fault environment.

Study of sedimentary basins 
The study of sedimentary basins as entities unto themselves is often referred to as sedimentary basin analysis. Study involving quantitative modeling of the dynamic geologic processes by which they evolved is called basin modelling.

The sedimentary rocks comprising the fill of sedimentary basins hold the most complete historical record of the evolution of the earth's surface over time. Regional study of these rocks can be used as the primary record for different kinds of scientific investigation aimed at understanding and reconstructing the earth's past plate tectonics (paleotectonics), geography (paleogeography, climate (paleoclimatology), oceans (paleoceanography), habitats (paleoecology and paleobiogeography). Sedimentary basin analysis is thus an important area of study for purely scientific and academic reasons. There are however important economic incentives as well for understanding the processes of sedimentary basin formation and evolution because almost all of the world's fossil fuel reserves were formed in sedimentary basins.

All of these perspectives on the history of a particular region are based on the study of a large three-dimensional body of sedimentary rocks that resulted from the fill of one or more sedimentary basins over time. The scientific studies of stratigraphy and in recent decades sequence stratigraphy are focused on understanding the three-dimensional architecture, packaging and layering of this body of sedimentary rocks as a record resulting from sedimentary processes acting over time, influenced by global sea level change and regional plate tectonics.

Surface geologic study
Where the sedimentary rocks comprising a sedimentary basin's fill are exposed at the earth's surface, traditional field geology and aerial photography techniques as well as satellite imagery can be used in the study of sedimentary basins.

Subsurface geologic study
Much of a sedimentary basin's fill often remains buried below the surface, often submerged in the ocean, and thus cannot be studied directly. Acoustic imaging using seismic reflection acquired through seismic data acquisition and studied through the specific sub-discipline of seismic stratigraphy is the primary means of understanding the three-dimensional architecture of the basin's fill through remote sensing.

Direct sampling of the rocks themselves is accomplished via the drilling of boreholes and the retrieval of rock samples in the form of both core samples and drill cuttings. These allow geologists to study small samples of the rocks directly and also very importantly allow paleontologists to study the microfossils they contain (micropaleontology).

At the time they are being drilled, boreholes are also surveyed by pulling electronic instruments along the length of the borehole in a process known as well logging. Well logging, which is sometimes appropriately called borehole geophysics, uses electromagnetic and radioactive properties of the rocks surrounding the borehole, as well as their interaction with the fluids used in the process of drilling the borehole, to create a continuous record of the rocks along the length of the borehole, displayed as of a family of curves. Comparison of well log curves between multiple boreholes can be used to understand the stratigraphy of a sedimentary basin, particularly if used in conjunction with seismic stratigraphy.

See also

References

External links
 Preliminary Catalog of the Sedimentary Basins of the United States United States Geological Survey
Global sedimentary basin map
Map/database of sedimentary basins of the World

 
Sedimentology
.